This is a list of companies founded by Stanford University alumni, including attendees who enrolled in degree-programs at Stanford but did not eventually graduate. This list is not exhaustive, as it only includes notable companies  of which the founding and development history is well recorded by reliable sources. In particular, subsidiaries are listed with their owners in parentheses.

Stanford University is one of the most successful universities in creating companies, attracting funding, and licensing its inventions to existing companies. It is often held up as a model for technology transfer. Stanford's Office of Technology Licensing is responsible for commercializing developments. The university is described as having a strong venture culture in which students are encouraged, and often funded, to launch their own companies.

According to PitchBook, from 2006 to 2017, Stanford produced 1,127 company founders as alumni or current students, more than any other university in the world; and these founders created 957 companies, second only to UC Berkeley in the world. In addition, according to a Stanford alumni survey conducted in 2011, some 39,900 companies founded by Stanford alumni were active, and companies founded by Stanford alumni altogether generated more than $2.7 trillion in annual revenue and had created 5.4 million jobs, roughly equivalent to the 10th-largest economy in the world (2011).

In this list, founders of a company which merged with other companies to form a new company are counted as founders of the new company. However, founders of a company which later dissolved into several successor companies are not counted as founders of those successor companies; this same rule applies to spin-off companies. Finally, a defunct company is a company that stopped functioning completely (e.g., bankrupt) without dissolving, merging or being acquired.

Top companies by revenues

Fortune Global 500 (2017) 
This list shows companies in Fortune Global 500 founded or co-founded by Stanford alumni. The cut-off revenue for 2017 Fortune Global 500 companies was $21,609M in 2016.

Fortune 1000 (2017) 
This list shows companies in Fortune 1000 (only for companies within the U.S.) founded or co-founded by Stanford alumni. The cut-off revenue for 2017 Fortune 1000 companies was $1,791M in 2016.

*: Trader Joe's does not reveal its annual revenue. Its revenue is estimated by Supermarket News.

**: Merger of different companies, at least one of which was founded by Stanford alumni.

***: Yahoo! was acquired by Verizon in 2017 and is no longer an independent company. However, it is still listed in Fortune 1000 by Fortune for 2017.

****:  Bain & Company are not listed in Fortune 1000. Its revenue is provided by Forbes.

Former Fortune-listed companies 
For each company, only the latest rankings (up to three years) are shown in this list.

Timeline

Index 
This index also contains companies listed in section "Notable defunct & dissolved".

Before 1960

1960 - 1979

1980 - 1999 

|
|
|}

2000 - present

Notable defunct & dissolved

See also 

 List of companies founded by Harvard University alumni
 List of companies founded by MIT alumni
 List of companies founded by UC Berkeley alumni 
 List of companies founded by University of Pennsylvania alumni 
 List of Stanford University people

Notes

References 

Stanford University
Stanford University alumni